Smart Songs is an educational music group founded in 2008 by Shoeless Jeff (Jeff DuJardin) and Scott Free (Scott Geer).  According to the group’s website www.SmartSongs.org, the mission of Smart Songs is to “provide kids and teachers with fun and educational hip hop that makes learning fun.”  Media sources ABC News Los Angeles (KABC-TV) and BostonInno.com have described the group as the current version of Schoolhouse Rock.  Album DVDs Trip to DC and Trip to Wall Street are currently distributed through Social Studies School Service.

Origins
Shoeless Jeff and Scott Free met each other while playing baseball for the Babe Ruth League in Providence, Rhode Island at age 13, while Jeff was playing shortstop and Scott was on second base. In high school, Jeff began writing educational raps for extra credit in his classes while he and Scott worked on non-educational hip hop songs.  In college together at Providence College, Jeff and Scott helped form a live hip hop band called Capitol Hill that toured the East Coast.  While on tour, the group visited an inner-city school in Dorchester, MA and realized their style of music fit well with students and decided to launch Smart Songs.

Albums
In 2011, Smart Songs released a remixed and remastered version of its album Trip to DC (originally released in 2008), which explains several topics in United States Social Studies and History.  The tracks include: Welcome to Washington, 3 Branches, Presidents, Voting, Political Parties, Political Parties (Original Album), Constitution, Bill of Rights, State Capitals Part I, State Capitals Part II, and Flag.   
Smart Songs released its second album Trip to Wall Street in 2013, which explains the economy and money management.  The tracks include: Money Management, Stock Market, Great Depression, Plastic Money, History of Money, Perfect Storm (which describes the 2008 economic crisis), and Way to Wealth.

Distribution
Album DVDs Trip to DC and Trip to Wall Street are currently distributed through Social Studies School Service.  The audio tracks are available on iTunes and Amazon.  Smart Songs began releasing YouTube videos to correspond with its songs in 2008, and the channel smartsongsmusic has approximately 5 million views and 20,000 subscribers.  In 2008, Smart Songs’ music was distributed through Highlights for Children, which is the largest children's magazine in the world with over 2 million subscribers. In 2010, Teachers Discovery began distributing Smart Songs’ new version of Trip to DC through its website and catalog.

Publicity
In January 2011, Smart Songs was interviewed by Harvard University’s School of Education for a university podcast.   This podcast also appeared on The Huffington Post.   
In October 2011, Smart Songs appeared on ABC News Los Angeles.  Other interviews include:
March 2012 - The Boston Globe (Boston.com) 
January 2012 – Boston Inno 
March 2009 – Bay State Banner 
October 2008 – The Providence Journal 
October 2008 – Fox Channel 12 Providence

Notes

External links
Smart Songs Official Site
Official Smart Songs Facebook Page
Official Smart Songs YouTube Channel
 

Musical groups from Rhode Island
Culture of Providence, Rhode Island